Hǫfuðlausn (‘head-ransom’) is the title of several Old Norse Skaldic poems:

 Hǫfuðlausn by Egill Skallagrímsson
 Hǫfuðlausn by Óttarr svarti
 Hǫfuðlausn by Þórarinn loftunga